Theobald, Teobaldo or Thibaut of Navarre may refer to:

Theobald I of Navarre, reigned 1234–1253
Theobald II of Navarre, reigned 1253–1270